Kveli is a surname. Notable people with the surname include:

Laila Kveli (born 1987), Norwegian cross-country skier
Ola H. Kveli (1921–2003), Norwegian politician